Go Deokmu (고덕무, 高德武) (r. 699-?) was a prince of Goguryeo and the founder of Lesser Goguryeo. He was the third son of King Bojang.

Revival movement 
Go Deokmu was appointed to the position of Governor of the Protectorate General to Pacify the East in 699, after his nephew Go Bowon refused the position.

See also 
 Lesser Goguryeo
 King Bojang
 Goguryeo
 Protectorate General to Pacify the East (Andong Dohubu)

Sources 
 http://www.dragon5.com/news/news2004031602.htm (한국일보 2004-3-16)
 https://web.archive.org/web/20070928133409/http://www.baedalguk.com/bbs/zboard.php?id=free&page=1&sn1=&divpage=1&sn=off&ss=on&sc=on&select_arrange=headnum&desc=asc&no=266

Goguryeo
History of Korea
8th-century rulers in Asia
7th-century Korean people